Karol Borsuk (May 8, 1905 – January 24, 1982) was a Polish mathematician. 
His main interest was topology, while he obtained significant results also in functional analysis.

Borsuk introduced the theory of absolute retracts (ARs) and absolute neighborhood retracts (ANRs), and the cohomotopy groups, later called Borsuk–Spanier cohomotopy groups. He also founded shape theory. He has constructed various beautiful examples of topological spaces, e.g. an acyclic, 3-dimensional continuum which admits a fixed point free homeomorphism onto itself; also 2-dimensional, contractible polyhedra which have no free edge. His topological and geometric conjectures and themes stimulated research for more than half a century; in particular, his open problems stimulated the infinite-dimensional topology.

Borsuk received his master's degree and doctorate from Warsaw University in 1927 and 1930, respectively; his PhD thesis advisor was Stefan Mazurkiewicz. He was a member of the Polish Academy of Sciences from 1952.   Borsuk's students included Samuel Eilenberg, Włodzimierz Holsztyński, Jan Jaworowski, Krystyna Kuperberg, Włodzimierz Kuperberg, Hanna Patkowska, and Andrzej Trybulec.

Works
 Geometria analityczna w n wymiarach (1950) (translated to English as Multidimensional Analytic Geometry, Polish Scientific Publishers, 1969)
 Podstawy geometrii (1955)
 Foundations of Geometry (1960) with Wanda Szmielew, North Holland publisher
 Theory of Retracts (1967), PWN, Warszawa.
 Theory of Shape (1975)
 Collected papers vol. I, (1983), PWN, Warszawa.

See also
 Bing–Borsuk conjecture
 Borsuk's conjecture
 Borsuk–Ulam theorem
 Zygmunt Janiszewski
 Stanislaw Ulam
 Scottish Café
 Animal Husbandry, an educational dice game published by Borsuk at his own expense in 1943 during the German occupation of Warsaw. The original game was lost during the Warsaw uprising in August 1944. Very few copies survived outside Warsaw and one was given back to the Borsuk family. The game is now published by Granna under the name of "Super Farmer".

References

External links 

Warsaw School of Mathematics
Topologists
Members of the Polish Academy of Sciences
University of Warsaw alumni
Academic staff of the University of Warsaw
People from Warsaw Governorate
1905 births
1982 deaths